John Wright  was an English priest and academic in the late 15th and early 16th centuries.

Wright graduated Bachelor of Canon Law in 1484. He was Master of Trinity Hall, Cambridge from 1505 until 1512. He held livings at Clothall and Layston. He died in 1519.

References

Masters of Trinity Hall, Cambridge
1519 deaths
16th-century English Roman Catholic priests